Kazimierz Woyda (1812 – 15 May 1877) was the President of Warsaw, succeeding his father Karol Fryderyk Woyda.

References

Mayors of Warsaw